Davide Lorenzini (born August 8, 1969, in Verona) is a retired diver from Italy.

Biography
He is best known for winning the bronze medal in the men's 3 m springboard at the 1991 European Championships in Athens, Greece. Lorenzini represented his native country in two consecutive Summer Olympics, starting in 1992 (Barcelona, Spain). He was affiliated with the carabinieri during his career.

References

External links
 

1969 births
Living people
Italian male divers
Divers at the 1992 Summer Olympics
Divers at the 1996 Summer Olympics
Olympic divers of Italy
Sportspeople from Verona
Divers of Centro Sportivo Carabinieri